Christopher James Cester (born 16 September 1981) is an Australian musician, songwriter, producer and founding mainstay drummer and backing vocalist of rock band Jet. As a member of Jet, Cester has won awards as a songwriter from the Australasian Performing Right Association (APRA), including in 2005 as Songwriter of the Year, and 2011 for "Seventeen", which won "Most Played Australian Work" and "Rock Work of the Year".

Early life 
Christopher James Cester was born in Melbourne, Australia, 16 September 1981. He has one older brother, Nicholas John "Nic" Cester (born 6 July 1979), and two younger brothers. Their parents were both children of immigrants to Australia. Their mother, Helen Isobel née McIvor (born 1957), has Scottish descent; and their father, Giovanni "John" Cester (1957–August 2004), had Italian descent.

During their childhood, Chris and Nic listened to music their parents liked, including The Beatles' Abbey Road, Stevie Wonder's Hotter Than July, Led Zeppelin, and The Kinks. As kids, the Cester brothers would play pretend gigs in their living room; Chris was the singer, but he eventually took up drums, pretending to play while Nic sang. The boys attended St Bede's College Mentone, where Chris took one year of drum lessons before teaching himself on a drum kit at home independently. An uncle, Eugene Cester (born 1961), known as Eugene de la Hot-Croix Bun, was a member of the Australian alternative/satire rock band TISM, which initially inspired Chris and Nic to pursue careers in music.

Music career

1996–2012 : Jet 

In 1996, Chris and Nic Cester formed Jet with Nic's schoolmate Cameron Muncey on guitar and vocals; Mark Wilson joined at a later time on bass guitar. The band used a variety of names before settling on Jet in 2002, named after the 1973 song "Jet" by former Beatle Paul McCartney and his band Wings. Chris primarily played the drums, sang, and wrote songs.

After finishing secondary school, the band began playing pub gigs around Melbourne; Chris and the band worked out songs they were writing, and they played rock covers. These songs would go on to be the tracks that turned into Jet's 2002 extended play, Dirty Sweet. Jet released the studio albums between 2003 and 2009 before disbanding in March 2012.

2011: DamnDogs 
By mid-2011, Cester had formed his own electro-rock band, DamnDogs, in Los Angeles with a cousin: Mitch McIvor on guitar; Jet's Mark Wilson on bass guitar; and that group's touring keyboardist, Louis Macklin. DamnDogs released a debut five-track EP, Strange Behaviour, on 9 August 2011.  DamnDogs played several shows around Los Angeles and in Australia before changing the lineup and turning into a new band iteration.

2016: Mystic Knights of Amnesia 
In 2016, Cester formed Mystic Knights of Amnesia with Jet bandmate Louis Macklin to write more experimental rock music. The band was named by friend and former Oasis guitarist and songwriter Noel Gallagher. The band is based out of Los Angeles, and the lineup consists of guitarist and singer Emmanuel Castro, guitarist Aaron Eisenberg, bassist John Pancost, and Louis Macklin on keys.

2018–2019: The Jaded Hearts Club 
Cester was the lead singer of rock supergroup The Jaded Hearts Club from 2018–2019. The lineup at the time consisted of Matt Bellamy of Muse, Graham Coxon of Blur, Sean Payne of The Zutons, Ilan Rubin of Nine Inch Nails, and Jamie Davis. Cester sang lead vocals alongside Miles Kane for a year of shows, including South By Southwest in Austin, Texas, and the Teenage Cancer Trust show in the Royal Albert Hall. Nic Cester sang with the band at a secret show in Los Angeles in 2018, and he took Chris's place in the band after Chris sustained a back injury from an accident in 2019.

Personal life 
Chris uses Gretsch drums, including a Brady 14- x 8-inch Jarrah Ply snare, and Zildjian cymbals. His cymbal setup is a pair of 15-inch A Zildjian New Beat Hats, and he has a 220-inch K Zildjian Dark Ride.

Chris lives with his partner and daughter in Los Angeles.

Awards and nominations

APRA Awards
The APRA Awards are presented annually from 1982 by the Australasian Performing Right Association (APRA).

|-
|rowspan="2"| 2005 || "Cold Hard Bitch" – Nicholas Cester, Christopher Cester, Cameron Muncey || Most Performed Australian Work Overseas || 
|-
| Jet – Nicholas Cester, Cameron Muncey, Chris Cester || Songwriter of the Year || 
|-
| 2006 ||  "Cold Hard Bitch" – Nicholas Cester, Christopher Cester, Cameron Muncey || Most Performed Australian Work Overseas || 
|-
|rowspan="2"| 2010 || "She's a Genius" – Christopher Cester || Most Played Australian Work || 
|-
| "She's a Genius" – Christopher Cester || Rock Work of the Year || 
|-
|rowspan="2"| 2011 || "Seventeen" – Nicholas Cester, Christopher Cester, Cameron Muncey || Most Played Australian Work || 
|-
| "Seventeen" – Nicholas Cester, Christopher Cester, Cameron Muncey  || Rock Work of the Year || 
|-
| 2021
| "Chase the Feeling" - Andrew Stockdale, Chris Cester, Jason Hill
| Most Performed Rock Work
|

References

General
  Note: [on-line] version established at White Room Electronic Publishing Pty Ltd in 2007 and was expanded from the 2002 edition.
 

Specific

1981 births
APRA Award winners
Australian people of Italian descent
Australian people of Scottish descent
Australian rock drummers
Male drummers
Jet (band) members
Living people
Musicians from Melbourne
The Wrights (Australian band) members
21st-century drummers
21st-century Australian male musicians
21st-century Australian musicians
Rock musicians
Rock drummers
People from Dingley Village, Victoria